
Year 109 BC was a year of the pre-Julian Roman calendar. At the time it was known as the Year of the Consulship of Numidicus and Silanus (or, less frequently, year 645 Ab urbe condita) and the Second Year of Yuanfeng. The denomination 109 BC for this year has been used since the early medieval period, when the Anno Domini calendar era became the prevalent method in Europe for naming years.

Events 
 By place 
 Roman Republic 
 A Roman army under Marcus Junius Silanus is defeated by the Cimbri and Teutones near the river Rhône.

 Asia 
 Emperor Wu of Han inspects the Han Empire, traveling . He also sends diplomats to search for the legendary Penglai Island.
 Han campaigns against Dian: Emperor Wu launches a new campaign against the Dian Kingdom and establishes the Yizhou commandery in Yunnan during the dynasty's expansion southward.
 Han invasion of Gojoseon
 After She He, a Han envoy, murders a minor king of the vassal state of Gojoseon and is rewarded by Emperor Wu with a military command, Ugeo, the king of Gojoseon, attacks and kills She He.
 Autumn - Emperor Wu orders the invasion. The Han general Yang Pu crosses the Yellow Sea and marches on the capital Wangxian (Pyongyang) but is defeated outside its gates. Another general, Xun Zhi, invades overland but fails to make headway.
 Peace negotiations are initiated by Emperor Wu but fail due to mutual suspicion.
 The Han general Zhao Ponu and 700 cavalrymen are victorious in the Battle of Loulan in the Tarim Basin, capturing the king of Loulan in the first Han intervention west of the Hexi Corridor.

Births

Deaths 
 Paerisades V, king of the Bosporan Kingdom (approximate date)
 Sames II Theosebes Dikaios, king of Commagene (Cappadocia)

References